Largs Campus is an amalgamation of Secondary, Early Years and Primary schools which includes; Largs Academy, Largs Primary, St Mary's Primary and Largs Early Years. It opened in March 2018, serving the towns of Largs, Fairlie, Skelmorlie and the island of Cumbrae, the academy takes placement requests from across Scotland, from places such as West Kilbride, Beith and Renfrewshire. The campus is in partnership with SportsScotland, providing what is believed to be the largest Fitness and Sports gym in the United Kingdom.

Early Years
Work on the Campus began in August 2016 with a budget of £52 million in partnership with North Ayrshire Council, Hub South West and Morrison Construction. The state of the art facility will support more than 2,000 students ranging from age 3 to 18, merging Brisbane and Kelburn Primary into Largs Primary as well as including St Mary's Primary School, Largs Academy and an Early Years Nursery.

Largs Primary, St Mary's Primary and Early Years nurseries moved into the new Campus March 12, 2018, with Largs Academy moving on April 18, 2018.

The Academy departments  
The Academy has 2 main buildings, the North Building and South Building. The North Building houses the Art, Modern Languages & RE , Social Subjects, English, Drama, Physical Education, Home Economics and Textiles and the Design and Technology departments. The south building houses Maths, Science and the school offices.

Feeder schools
Largs Campus’ feeder schools are Cumbrae Primary School, Fairlie Primary School, Largs Primary, St Mary's Primary and Skelmorlie Primary School.

References

Secondary schools in North Ayrshire
2018 establishments in Scotland
Educational institutions established in 2018